The Paris Air Show is a trade fair and air show held in odd years at Paris–Le Bourget Airport in France. Organized by the French aerospace industry's primary representative body, the Groupement des industries françaises aéronautiques et spatiales (GIFAS), it is the largest air show and aerospace-industry exhibition event in the world, measured by number of exhibitors and size of exhibit space, followed by UK's Farnborough Air Show, Dubai Air Show, and Singapore Airshow.

First held in 1909, the Paris Air Show was held every odd year from 1949 to 2019, when the 53rd Air Show attracted 2,453 exhibitors from 49 countries and occupied more than 125,000 square meters. Organizers canceled the 2021 show due to the COVID pandemic and said it would resume in 2023.

It is a large trade fair, demonstrating military and civilian aircraft, and is attended by many military forces and the major aircraft manufacturers, often announcing major aircraft sales.
It starts with four professional days and is then opened to the general public followed from Friday to Sunday. The format is similar to Farnborough and the ILA Berlin Air Show, both staged in even years.

History 

The Paris Air Show traces its history to 1908, when a section of the Paris Motor Show was dedicated to aircraft.
The following year, a dedicated air show was held at the Grand Palais from 25 September to 17 October, during which 100,000 visitors turned out to see products and innovations from 380 exhibitors. There were four further shows before the First World War.  

The air show continued to be held at the Grand Palais, and from 1949 flying demonstrations were staged at Paris Orly Airport. In 1953, the show was relocated from the Grand Palais to Le Bourget. The show was drawing international notice in the 1960s. Since the 1970s, the show has emerged as the main international reference of the aeronautical sector.

1967
The 1967 air show was opened by French President Charles de Gaulle, who toured the exhibits and shook hands with two Soviet cosmonauts and two American astronauts.
Prominently displayed by the Soviet Union was a three-stage Vostok rocket, such as the one that had carried Yuri Gagarin into space on April 12, 1961. The "extraordinarily powerful" Vostok was downplayed by American missile experts as "rather old and unsophisticated." The American exhibit, the largest at the fair, featured the F-111 swing-wing fighter bomber, a replica of Charles Lindbergh's Spirit of St. Louis. and the Ling-Temco-Vought XC-142A, a cargo plane capable of a vertical takeoff and landing.
A full-size model of the supersonic Concorde was displayed by the French and British, auguring its successful first flight on March 2, 1969.

1969
"The largest plane in the world," the Boeing 747 jet airliner, arrived on June 3, after flying non-stop from Seattle, Washington, and the Apollo 8 command module, charred by its re-entry, was there flanked by the Apollo 9 astronauts, but the most-viewed exhibit was the supersonic Concorde, which made its first flight over Paris as the show opened.

1971
The Soviet TU-144 supersonic airliner was flown to Le Bourget for the 1971 show, drawing comparisons with the French Concorde. Landing with the Concorde was the world's largest aircraft, the American Lockheed C-5A Galaxy.

1973
The crash of the Soviet Tu-144, see below, overshadowed the 1973 show, otherwise characterized by "There was nothing new", although the flying was memorable, and there were many great exhibits.

1975
One hundred and eighty-two aircraft were scheduled for appearance. Despite restrictions that followed the TU-144 crash in 1973, a day of flying pleased viewers. In particular, the American YF-16 and the French Mirage F-1E competed in turn before a critical audience. Days later, Belgium became the fourth European nation to choose the YF-16 over the F-1E.

1977
Celebration of Charles Lindbergh's trans-Atlantic flight to Le Bourget fifty years ago recalled that historic event. Anne Morrow Lindbergh, Lindbergh's widow, attended the ceremony along with early trans-Atlantic pilots, Maurice Bellonte and Armand Lotti. Recent extension of coastal limits to 200 nautical miles has produced new maritime-reconnaissance (MR) aircraft. The crash of a Fairchild A-10 tank-destroyer led to tightened rules on air show demonstrations.

1979
Two airliners, the Airbus A310 and the Boeing 767, are competing for the international market, but neither will carry passengers before 1982. The Westland WG30 transport helicopter shows promise. "The Mirage 4000 remains a question mark" despite being "surely the main highlight this year at Le Bourget."

1981
Exhibiting at the show, Airbus, Boeing, and McDonnell Douglas/Fokker vie for the 150-seat airline market, while Rolls-Royce/Japan, General Electric/Snecma (CFM), and Pratt & Whitney contest for their engines. The Northrop F-5G Tigershark mockup was on display and expected to fly in 1982 with delivery the following year. A novelty was Air Transat, a light aircraft trans-Atlantic race from Le Bourget to Sikorsky Memorial Airport in Bridgeport, Connecticut, and back, won by a twin engine Piper Navaho and a Beechcraft Bonanza.

1983
The American Space Shuttle Enterprise was flown around Paris and towered over other exhibits, but "much more intriguing" were replicas of two twin-engined fighters, the British Aerospace ACA and French Dassault Breguet ACX. Sales of Boeing 757 and Airbus A310 airliners to Singapore Airlines were welcome news during an ongoing recession.

1985
The Soviet Antonov An-124 Ruslan military heavy lifter was the largest exhibit in 1985. Propfan engines stirred interest. Reflecting the upturn in the economy, Boeing and Airbus announced new contracts totaling as much as $1,700 million. The Hubble Space Telescope should be deployed in 1986.

1987
Newly introduced, in the rain, were the Soviet Mil Mi-34 Helicopter, the Israeli Super Phantom, and the Harrier GR.5. Airbus announced firm orders for both the A330 and A340 airliners. Exhibiting at the show for the first time, the Chinese displayed, among others, the A-5C Attacker (Fantan) and FT-7. Richard Rutan and Jeana Yeager, who flew a Voyager non-stop around the world without refueling, were present, but their aircraft was not.

1989 

The "38th Paris International Air and Space Show" or "1989 Paris Air Show", featured a variety of aerospace technology from NATO and Warsaw Pact nations.
A Mikoyan MiG-29 crashed during a demonstration flight with no loss of life.  The then-Soviet space shuttle Buran and its carrier, Antonov An-225 Mriya, was displayed at this show.
A Sukhoi Su-27 made debut to western world, as well first publicly seen "Cobra" maneuver.

1991
Despite a Department of Defense display of the F-117A Stealth Fighter and other Gulf War armaments, most American contractors stayed home, so Soviet aircraft drew attention, among them the Beriev Be-42 Mermaid (A-40 Albatros) amphibian, the MiG-31 Foxhound interceptor, and the Yak-141 short take-off/vertical landing (ASTOVL) supersonic fighter. When it receives its first customer order, Dassault plans to begin production of the Mirage 2000-5, which is a "new machine compared to the basic Mirage 2000."

1993 
The show attracted 1,611 exhibitors from 39 countries and nearly 300,000 visitors attended the show. Dassault featured the debut of the Falcon 2000, and Airbus will manufacture the 130-seat A319.

1995 

The 41st Paris Air Show main attraction was the stealth B-2 Spirit bomber, along with the Tupolev Tu-160 and Sukhoi Su-34 bombers.
The flying display included the Bell-Boeing V-22 tilt-rotor, the Airbus Beluga Super Transporter, the Eurofighter 2000, the Rockwell-MBB X-31 high-manoeuvrability fighter demonstrator, the McDonnell Douglas C-17 military transport, the Eurocopter EC135 civil helicopter, the Sukhoi Su-35 fighter, and the Daimler-Benz Aerospace Dornier 328-100, and for the first time on static  the Boeing 777, Saab Gripen, Atlas Cheetah Mirage and Cessna Citation X.

1997
America Eagle announced purchase of forty-two EMB-145 regional jets from Embraer and twenty-five Bombardier CRJ700 airliners from Bombardier. Spectators saw two Eurofighter Typhoon EF2000s flying together. A full-scale mock-up of the Bell Boeing 609 civil tilt-rotor aircraft attracted attention. IAR Brasov featured a prototype Anti-Tank Optronic Search and Combat System (SOCAT) helicopter, an upgrade of the IAR-330 Puma.

1999
The 1999 show continued a trend away from displays of new aircraft toward announcements of new contracts. Although new entries such as the Fairchild 30-seat 328JET and the Boeing 100-seat 717-200
 attracted interest, airlines ordered as many as 103 Embraer ERJ-135s and 145s in addition to a 4.9 billion-dollar order for ERJ-170s and ERJ-190-200s. In February, the Russian Il-103 received US Federal Aviation Administration (FAA) approval, a breakthrough in certifying Russian aircraft for the American market. Subsequent certification for the Ilyushin Il-96T wide-bodied jet was displayed at the show.

2001
Boeing introduced scale models of their Sonic Cruiser which would reach speeds approaching Mach 0.98, together with a walk-through hologram. The Airbus A380, seating 555, offered size rather than speed, and was there on the tarmac. Crowds toured the restored Antonov An-225 Dream, the world's largest aircraft. Dassault featured a model of the new Falcon FNX business jet that is projected to fly 10,500 kilometers at Mach 0.88. The Joint Strike Fighter (JSF), which is undergoing STOVL testing, is a likely replacement for older American F-15E Strike Eagles and F-117 Nighthawks.

2003
The Concorde F-BTSD made its farewell landing at Le Bourget on June 14, the opening day, and the Dassault's Mirage 2000 and Rafale put on a show overhead. Pilotless planes, such as the Northrop Grumman RQ-4 Global Hawk and General Atomics Predator drew attention. Boeing publicized the 7E7 Dreamliner.

2005
FlightGlobal cited the Airbus A380 and "nineteen remarkable first appearances," including Dassault's Falcon 7X and Gulfstream's G550 business jets, Embraer's EMB-195 regional jet, and the second prototype of Alenia Aermacchi's M-346 advanced jet trainer. CompositesWorld added the Boeing 777-200LR and the Dassault UCAV Neuron.

2007
The Boeing 787 Dreamliner sold briskly, as did the Airbus A380 and A350 XWB. A mockup of the Lockheed Martin Joint Strike Fighter was on display. The IAI Heron TP UAV is ready to enter production. The Spanish steer-by-leaning AN-1 AeroQuad flying platform from Aeris Naviter weighed only 100 kilograms.

2009 

The 48th International Paris Air Show took place in 2009 and marked a hundred years of technological innovation in aeronautics and space conquest. The event was held from 15 to 21 June, at Le Bourget. A memorial service was held for the victims of Air France Flight 447.

2011

The 2011 show was the 49th presentation, and hosted over  international exhibitors in 28 international pavilions. A total of 150 aircraft were on display, including the solar-electric aircraft Solar Impulse.

A demo A380 was damaged the day before the exhibition opened and needed a replacement; while the new Airbus A400M Atlas military transport aircraft had an engine failure, but could still perform some demonstration flights.

2013

American fighter jets were not on display for the first time in more than two decades due to budget cuts.

2015

The 2015 show, held from June 15 to June 21, 2015, saw the new Dassault Falcon 8X, Airbus A350 XWB and Bombardier CS300 and received 351,584 visitors, 2,303 exhibitors over 122,500 square metres of exhibition space, 4,359 journalists from 72 countries and 130 billion euros in purchases and "cemented its position as the world's largest event dedicated to the aerospace industry".
During the show, Airbus Helicopters announced a successor to the Super Puma, called the Airbus Helicopters X6.

2017

The 52nd Air Show was held from 19 to 25 June 2017, with 2,381 exhibitors from 48 countries, showing 140 aircraft including for the first time the Airbus A321neo, Airbus A350-1000, Boeing 787-10, Boeing 737 MAX 9, Kawasaki P-1, Mitsubishi MRJ90 and Lockheed Martin F-35.
Inaugurated by French President Emmanuel Macron, it was visited by 290 official delegations from 98 countries and 7 international organizations, French Prime Minister Édouard Philippe, 3,450 journalists, 142,000 trade visitors and 180,000 general public visitors.
Announcements for 934 commercial aircraft orders and purchasing commitments were worth a catalogue value of US$115 billion.

There were 1,226 order and commitments : 352 firm orders, 699 letters of intent or memorandums of understanding, 40 options and  135 options letters of intent; plus 229 conversions of existing orders, mainly for the Boeing 737-10 MAX variant launched at the show.
There were mainly narrowbodies with 1,021 orders or commitments against 76 widebodies, 48 regional jets and 81 turboprop airliners.
With 766, mainly preliminary deals, Boeing led Airbus with 331, while Bombardier Aerospace had 64, Embraer 48 and ATR Aircraft 17.
Nearly half of those order and commitments was from aircraft lessors with 513, and where the operator was known, 43% came from Asia-Pacific, 27% from the middle east, 10% from Europe as from South America, 7% from Africa and 3% from North America.

2019

The air show ended with 866 aircraft commitments totalling $60.9 billion (130 firm orders, 562 LoI/MoU, 119 options and 55 options on LoIs): 388 for Airbus including 243 newly launched A321XLRs and 85 A220s, 232 for Boeing including 200 737 MAXes for IAG, 145 for ATR and 78 for Embraer; 558 narrowbodies, 62 widebodies, 93 regional jets and 153 turboprops.

2021

Due to the Impact of the COVID-19 pandemic, the June 2021 Paris Air Show  was cancelled, the next edition is planned for June 2023.

Accidents

1961 
A Convair B-58 Hustler crashed while doing low-altitude aerobatics. The aircraft reportedly flew into a cloud bank, where visual reference was lost, and crashed.

1965 
Another Convair B-58 crashed while on final approach during an overweight landing. The aircraft touched down short of the runway, killing United States Air Force Lt. Colonel Charles D. Tubbs. Two other crewmen were injured.

1969 
A Fairchild-Hiller FH-1100 helicopter crashed killing the pilot. Witnesses of the crash cite seeing "something wrong with the main rotor".

1973 

At the Paris Air Show on June 3, 1973, the second Tupolev Tu-144 production aircraft (registration SSSR-77102) crashed during its display. It stalled while attempting a rapid climb. Trying to pull out of the subsequent dive, the aircraft broke up and crashed, destroying 15 houses and killing all six on board and eight on the ground; a further sixty people received serious injuries.

The cause of this accident remains controversial. Theories include: the Tu-144 climbed to avoid a French Mirage chase plane whose pilot was attempting to photograph it; that changes had been made by the ground engineering team to the auto-stabilisation circuits to allow the Tu-144 to outperform the Concorde in the display circuit; and that the crew were attempting a manoeuvre and to outshine the Concorde.

1977 
An A-10 Thunderbolt II crashed killing the pilot.

1989 
A Mikoyan MiG-29 crashed during a demonstration flight with no loss of life.

1999 
A Sukhoi Su-30 crashed during a demonstration flight with no loss of life.

See also 

 Aero India
 EAA AirVenture Oshkosh
 Farnborough International Airshow
 ILA Berlin Air Show

References

External links 

 GIFAS, organisers of the Paris Air Show

Arms fairs
Air shows
Trade fairs in France
Aviation in France
1909 establishments in France
Recurring events established in 1909
Biennial events
Events in Paris
Aviation exhibitions